Death of a Blue Movie Star is a novel by crime writer Jeffery Deaver. First published in 1990, it is the second book in the Rune Trilogy.

Synopsis

1990 American novels
Novels by Jeffery Deaver
Rune Trilogy (novel series)
Novels set in New York (state)
Bantam Books books